Ernest Dubac (15 February 1914 – 27 February 1985) was a Croatian and Yugoslav professional football player and football manager.

Club career
Born in Osijek, Dubac started his career with Hajduk Osijek before moving to JŠK Slavija Osijek. In 1937, he joined BSK Belgrade where he became one of the best centre-backs in the country and became a regular in the national team. He played for BSK until 1941 and won the 1938–39 Yugoslav Championship.

When World War II started in Yugoslavia, he moved to HŠK Građanski Zagreb in the Croatian First League in 1941. He was champion of the Independent State of Croatia with Građanski in 1943, with whom he finished his career a year later.

International career
Dubac played 14 games for the Yugoslav national team, making his debut in a 1–0 home win against Poland in Belgrade on 3 August 1938. He then joined the Independent Croatian national team in 1941, playing all 15 games which the team played during World War II.

Managerial career
After retiring, Dubac became a manager, managing NK Osijek from 1951 to 1955, NK Čelik Zenica in 1958 and NK Trešnjevka from 1959 to 1966. He won the Croatian-Slovenian League (II tier competition of football in Yugoslavia at the time) with Osijek in the 1952–53 season and got the club promoted to the Yugoslav First League.

He won the Second League with Trešnjevka as well, this time in the 1962–63 season in the West Division. He then led Trešnjevka in the Yugoslav First League for three seasons, from 1963 to 1966, until the club got relegated.

Personal life
In later life, Dubac became a dentist, after which he retired from that job as well in 1978. Seven years later, he died in his hometown of Osijek on 25 February 1985 at the age of 71.

Honours

Player
BSK Belgrade 
Yugoslav First League: 1938–39
Serbian Football League: 1940–41

Građanski Zagreb
Independent State of Croatia championship: 1943

Manager
Osijek
Croatian-Slovenian League (II tier competition in Yugoslavia at the time): 1952–53

Trešnjevka
Yugoslav Second League - West Division: 1962–63

References

External links
Ernest Dubac at Football Database

1914 births
1985 deaths
Footballers from Osijek
People from the Kingdom of Croatia-Slavonia
Association football central defenders
Croatian footballers
Croatia international footballers
Yugoslav footballers
Yugoslavia international footballers
Dual internationalists (football)
OFK Beograd players
HŠK Građanski Zagreb players
Yugoslav First League players
Yugoslav football managers
NK Osijek managers
NK Čelik Zenica managers
Burials at Saint Anne Cemetery